The 2019 Seniors 6-Red World Championship (known for sponsorship reasons as the 2019 ROKiT Seniors 6-Red World Championship) was a winner-takes-all seniors six-red snooker tournament, that took place on 3 March 2019 at the Waterfront Hall in Belfast, Northern Ireland. It was the third event on the 2018/2019 World Seniors Tour and the first edition of this tournament.

A qualifying tournament took place from 8 to 10 February in the Crucible Sports Club in Newbury. Jonathan Bagley won 4–3 in the final against Wayne Cooper.

Jimmy White won the title, defeating World Seniors Champion Aaron Canavan 4–2 in the final.

Prize fund
The breakdown of prize money is shown below:

Winner: £20,000 (Winner takes all)
Total: £20,000

Main draw

Final

References 

World Seniors Tour
2019 in snooker
Six-red snooker competitions
2019 in Northern Ireland sport
Sports competitions in Belfast
March 2019 sports events in the United Kingdom